Kaiser-e-Hind or Qaiser-i-Hind is a citadel in the Indian state of Punjab. The fortress was briefly occupied by Pakistani military and was later returned to India after the end of 1971 India-Pakistan War.

Capture of Qaiser-e-Hind

On 3 December 1971, a unit of 41st Baloch under the command of Lt. Colonel Habib Ahmed launched an attack to capture the Qaiser-i-Hind fortress and the perimeter in the Hussainiwala sector. The unit of 41st Baloch was supported by 45 Field Regiment under the command of Major General Akhtar Abdur Rahman. The fierce battle involved usage of heavy artillery and tanks by both sides. The Indian Air Force was also used to attack the advancing Pakistani troops. On the night of 4th December 1971, the Indian troops withdrew from the area. Qaiser-i-Hind citadel and Hussainiwala remained under the control Pakistani troops throughout the war. Following the end of 1971 war, the occupied territory was returned to India.

Many officers and soldiers of 41st Baloch were awarded medals for displaying act of bravery and courage throughout the conflict. Major General Akhtar's 45th field regiment earned the title of "Fateh Qasar-e-Hind" for their performance during the capture of Qaiser-i-Hind.

Reference

Monuments and memorials in India